The Diocese of Jefferson City is a Latin Church ecclesiastical territory or diocese of the Catholic Church in the state of Missouri in the United States, The diocese consists of 38 counties in mainly rural northeastern and central Missouri, and includes the urban areas of Columbia, and the state capital Jefferson City.  The Cathedral of Saint Joseph is located in Jefferson City. It is a suffragan diocese in the ecclesiastical province of the metropolitan Archdiocese of St. Louis.

History

On July 2, 1956 Pope Pius XII established the Diocese of Jefferson City.  Its territory was taken from the Archdiocese of St. Louis, the Diocese of Kansas City, and the Diocese of Saint Joseph.

The diocese has 95 parishes, 15 missions, 68 active diocesan priests, 8 religious priests, and 88,000 Catholics.  It has 73 Women Religious, 2 Religious Brothers, and 90 permanent deacons.

Bishops 
The bishops of the diocese and their terms of service:
 Joseph M. Marling, C.PP.S. (1956-1969)
 Michael Francis McAuliffe (1969-1997)
 John R. Gaydos (1997-2017)
 Shawn McKnight (2018–present)

Other priest of this diocese who became bishop
 Anthony Joseph O'Connell, appointed Bishop of Knoxville in 1988

High schools
 Helias High School, Jefferson City
 Sacred Heart High School, Sedalia
 Father Tolton Regional Catholic High School,  Columbia

Newspaper
"The Catholic Missourian" is the official newspaper of the diocese. Copies of the current issue are available at parishes and on the diocesan website.

Alphonse J. Schwartze Memorial Catholic Center

The Alphonse J. Schwartze Memorial Catholic Center serves as the chancery offices for the diocese of Jefferson City.  It is located adjacent to the Cathedral of Saint Joseph.  It is the pastoral center and a headquarters for the diocese.  The center is named in memory of Alphonse J. Schwartze, a philanthropist who was the primary benefactor. Schwartze was a parishioner of St. Joseph's Church in Westphalia, Missouri.  Groundbreaking for the center took place on April 1, 2004, with John R. Gaydos, Bishop of Jefferson City, presiding.  Also, present was Schwartze's brother, Emil.  Blessing of the completed center took place on October 7, 2007.  Present for the blessing were Gaydos and bishops from neighboring dioceses in Missouri: Raymond L. Burke, Archbishop of St. Louis; Robert W. Finn, Bishop of Kansas City-Joseph; and John Joseph Leibrecht, Bishop of Springfield-Cape Girardeau; Robert J. Herman, Auxiliary Bishop of St. Louis.

History
The chancery for the diocese had several addresses prior to the current one.  The first was a temporary one located at 505 Bolivar Street in Jefferson City.  The first permanent chancery was at 312 East Capitol Avenue from 1957 until 1968.  From 1968 until 2005, the chancery was located at 605 Clark Avenue in Jefferson City.

Features

St. Alphonsus Chapel
The Saint Alphonsus Chapel is dedicated to St. Alphonsus Maria de Liguori. It is dominated by an imported 4½ foot wooden image of Christ modeled after the Gero Crucifix of the Cathedral of St. Peter and the Virgin Mary in Cologne, Germany.  The selection of this crucifix was made in order to link the occupation of the building with World Youth Day which was held in Cologne in 2005.  The chapel seats 50 people.

Artwork
The walls of the center display various gifts from the clergy and laity of the diocese. The vast majority of the original paintings are by Louis Wellington McCorkle, who was a member of the American Artists Professional League. The Peruvian artwork is from the estate of the late Francis G. Gillgannon. Photographs are from the collection of historical archives of the diocese.

See also

 Catholic Church by country
 Catholic Church in the United States
 Ecclesiastical Province of Saint Louis
 Global organisation of the Catholic Church
 List of Roman Catholic archdioceses (by country and continent)
 List of Roman Catholic dioceses (alphabetical) (including archdioceses)
 List of Roman Catholic dioceses (structured view) (including archdioceses)
 List of the Catholic dioceses of the United States

References

External links
 Official Site

 
Jefferson City
Christian organizations established in 1956
Jefferson City
Buildings and structures in Jefferson City, Missouri
Catholic Church in Missouri
Jefferson City